The history of pizza begins in antiquity, as various ancient cultures produced basic flatbreads with several toppings.

Modern pizza evolved from similar flatbread dishes in Naples, Italy, in the 18th or early 19th century.

The word pizza was first documented in AD 997 in Gaeta and successively in different parts of Central and Southern Italy. Pizza was mainly eaten in Italy and by emigrants from there. This changed after World War II when Allied troops stationed in Italy came to enjoy pizza along with other Italian foods.

Origins
In Sardinia, French and Italian archaeologists have found bread baked over 7,000 years ago. According to Philippe Marinval, the local islanders leavened this bread. Foods similar to pizza have been made since antiquity. Records of people adding other ingredients to bread to make it more flavorful can be found throughout ancient history.

 In the 6th century BC, Persian soldiers serving under Darius the Great baked flatbreads with cheese and dates on top of their battle shields.
 In Ancient Greece, citizens made a flatbread called plakous (πλακοῦς, gen. πλακοῦντοςplakountos) which was flavored with toppings like herbs, onion, cheese and garlic.
 An early reference to a pizza-like food occurs in the Aeneid (c. 19 BC), when Celaeno, the Harpy queen, foretells that the Trojans would not find peace until they were forced by hunger to eat their tables (Book III). In Book VII, Aeneas and his men are served a meal that includes round cakes (like pita bread) topped with cooked vegetables. When they eat the bread, they realize that these are the "tables" prophesied by Celaeno.

Some commentators have suggested that the origins of modern pizza can be traced to pizzarelle, which were kosher for Passover cookies eaten by Roman Jews after returning from the synagogue on that holiday, though some also trace its origins to other Italian paschal bread.
Other examples of flatbreads that survive to this day from the ancient Mediterranean world are focaccia (which may date back as far as the ancient Etruscans); Manakish in the Levant, coca (which has sweet and savory varieties) from Catalonia, Valencia and the Balearic Islands; the Greek Pita; Lepinja in the Balkans; or Piadina in the Romagna part of Emilia-Romagna in Italy.

Foods similar to flatbreads in other parts of the world include Chinese bing (a wheat flour-based Chinese food with a flattened or disk-like shape); the Indian paratha (in which fat is incorporated); the Central and South Asian naan (leavened) and roti (unleavened); the Sardinian carasau, spianata, guttiau, pistoccu; and Finnish rieska. Also worth noting is that throughout Europe, there are many similar pies based on the idea of covering flat pastry with cheese, meat, vegetables and seasoning, such as the Alsatian flammkuchen, German zwiebelkuchen, and French quiche.

In 16th-century Naples, a galette flatbread was referred to as a pizza; it was known as a dish for poor people, particularly as street food, and was not considered a kitchen recipe until much later. It was not until the Spanish brought the tomato from the Americas and developed the modern variation that Pizzas in their modern conception were invented. It is said that the tomato reached the Kingdom of Naples and Sicily, at the time part of the Spanish Empire, through either Pedro Álvarez de Toledo in the 16th century or viceroy Manuel de Amat, who may have gifted some seeds to the Neapolitans in 1770 on behalf of the Viceroyalty of Peru.

In 1843, Alexandre Dumas described the diversity of pizza toppings. An often recounted story holds that on June 11, 1889, to honour the queen consort of Italy, Margherita of Savoy, the Neapolitan pizza maker Raffaele Esposito created the "Pizza Margherita", a pizza garnished with tomatoes, mozzarella, and basil, to represent the national colours of Italy as on the Flag of Italy. But the Pizza Margherita already existed: "The most popular and famous pizzas from Naples were the ‘Marinara’, created in 1734, and the ‘Margherita’, which dates from 1796-1810. The latter was presented to the Queen of Italy upon her visit to Naples in 1889, specifically on account of the colour of its seasoning (tomato, mozzarella and basil), which are reminiscent of the colours of the Italian flag."

Pizza evolved into a variety of bread and tomato dish often served with cheese. However, until the late 19th or early 20th century, the dish was sweet, not savory, and earlier versions that were savory resembled the flatbreads now known as schiacciata. Pellegrino Artusi's classic early-twentieth-century cookbook, La Scienza in cucina e l'Arte di mangiar bene gives three recipes for pizza, all of which are sweet. After the feedback of some readers, Artusi added a typed sheet in the 1911 edition (discovered by food historian Alberto Capatti), bound with the volume, with the recipe of "pizza alla napoletana": mozzarella, tomatoes, anchovies and mushrooms.

However, by 1927, Ada Boni's first edition of il talismano della felicità (a well-known Italian cookbook) includes a recipe using tomatoes and mozzarella.

Innovation
The innovation that led to flatbread pizza was the use of tomato as a topping. For some time after the tomato was brought to Europe from the Americas in the 16th century, it was believed by many Europeans to be poisonous, as are some other fruits of the Solanaceae (nightshade) family. By the late 18th century, it was common for the poor of the area around Naples to add tomato to their yeast-based flatbread, thus the pizza began.

According to documents discovered by historian Antonio Mattozzi in the State Archive of Naples, in 1807, 54 pizzerias existed; listed were owners and addresses. In the second half of the nineteenth century the number of pizzerias increased to 120.

In Naples, two other figures connected to the trade existed – the pizza hawker (pizzaiuolo ambulante), who sold pizza but did not make it, and the seller of pizza "a oggi a otto", who made pizzas and sold them in return for a payment for seven days.

The pizza marinara method has a topping of tomato, oregano, garlic, and extra virgin olive oil. It is named "marinara" because it was traditionally prepared by the seaman's wife 'la marinara" for her seafaring husband upon returning from fishing trips in the Bay of Naples.

The margherita is topped with modest amounts of tomato sauce, mozzarella, and fresh basil. It is widely attributed to baker Raffaele Esposito, who worked at the restaurant "Pietro... e basta così" ("Pietro... and that's enough"), established in 1880 and remaining in business as "Pizzeria Brandi". Though recent research casts doubt on this legend, the tale holds that, in 1889, he baked three different pizzas for the visit of King Umberto I and Queen Margherita of Savoy. The Queen's favorite was a pizza evoking the colors of the Italian flag – green (basil leaves), white (mozzarella), and red (tomatoes). According to the tale, this combination was named Pizza Margherita in her honor. Although those were the most preferred, there are many variations of pizzas today.

"Associazione Verace Pizza Napoletana" ("True Neapolitan Pizza Association"), which was founded in 1984, has set the very specific rules that must be followed for an authentic Neapolitan pizza. These include that the pizza must be baked in a wood-fired, domed oven; the base must be hand-kneaded and must not be rolled with a pin or prepared by any mechanical means (i pizzaioli – the pizza makers –  make the pizza by rolling it with their fingers) and that the pizza must not exceed 35 centimetres in diameter or be more than one-third of a centimetre thick at the centre. The association also selects pizzerias globally to produce and spread the verace pizza napoletana philosophy and method.

There are many famous pizzerias in Naples where these traditional pizzas can be found, such as Da Michele, Port'Alba, Brandi, Di Matteo, Sorbillo, Trianon, and Umberto. Most of them are in the ancient historical center of Naples. These pizzerias follow even stricter standards than the specified rules. For example, using only San Marzano tomatoes grown on the slopes of Mount Vesuvius and drizzling the olive oil and adding tomato topping in only a clockwise direction.

The pizza bases in Naples are soft and pliable. In Rome, they prefer a thin and crispy base. Another popular form of pizza in Italy is "pizza al taglio", which is pizza baked in rectangular trays with a wide variety of toppings and sold by weight.

In 1962, the "Hawaiian" pizza, a pizza topped with pineapple and ham, was invented in Canada by restaurateur Sam Panopoulos at the Satellite Restaurant in Chatham, Ontario.

In December 2009, the pizza napoletana was granted Protected Designation of Origin (PDO) status by the European Union.

In 2012, the world's largest pizza was made in Rome. It measured 1261.65 square meters in area.

In 2016, robotics company BeeHex, widely covered in the media, was building robots that 3D-printed pizza.

In December 2017, the pizza napoletana was inscribed on the UNESCO Intangible Cultural Heritage Lists.

Pizza in Canada

Canada's first pizzeria opened in 1948, Pizzeria Napoletana in Montreal. The first pizza ovens started entering the country in the late 1950s; it gained popularity throughout the 1960s, with many pizzerias and restaurants opening across the country. Pizza was mostly served in restaurants and small pizzerias. Most pizza restaurants across Canada also serve popular Italian cuisine in addition to pizza, such as pasta, salad, soups and sandwiches. Fast-food pizza chains also provide other side options for customers to choose from, in addition to ordering pizza, including chicken wings, fries and poutine, salad, and calzones. Pizza Pops are a Canadian calzone-type snack introduced in the 1960s. Pizza chains across Canada can be found in shopping centres, schools, and neighbourhood plazas, with the majority of these chains offering a sit-and-dine facility for customers.

The most distinct pizza in Canada is the "Canadian" pizza. A "Canadian" pizza is usually prepared with tomato sauce, mozzarella cheese, pepperoni, mushrooms, and bacon. Many variations of this pizza exist, but the two standout ingredients that make this pizza distinctly Canadian are bacon and mushrooms. Pizzas in Canada are almost never served with "Canadian bacon", or "back bacon", as it is referred to in Canada. Rather, side bacon is the standard pork topping on pizza.

In the province of Quebec Pizza-ghetti is a combination meal commonly found in fast food or family restaurants. It consists of a pizza, sliced in half, accompanied by a small portion of spaghetti with a tomato-based sauce. Although both pizza and spaghetti are considered staples of Italian cuisine, combining them in one dish is completely unknown in Italy. A popular variant involves using spaghetti as a pizza topping under the pizza's mozzarella cheese.

Some of Canada's successful pizza brands include: Boston Pizza and Pizza Pizza. Boston Pizza, also known as BP's in Canada, and "Boston'sthe Gourmet Pizza" in the United States and Mexico, is one of Canada's largest franchising restaurants. The brand has opened over 325 locations across Canada and 50 locations in Mexico and the US. The first Boston Pizza location was opened in Edmonton, Alberta, in 1964, and operated under the name "Boston Pizza & Spaghetti House", with locations still opening across the nation.

Pizza Pizza, and its subsidiary chain Pizza 73 in Western Canada, are among Canada's largest domestic brands based in Ontario. To date, they have over 500 locations nationwide and fill more than 29 million orders annually.

With pizza gaining popularity across the nation, major American pizza chains such as Pizza Hut, Domino's Pizza and Little Caesars have expanded their locations in Canada, competing against the domestic Canadian brands. The major American pizza chains have brought their signature classic pizza recipes and toppings into their Canadian chains, offering their traditional classic pizzas to Canadian customers. However, the American chains have also created Canadian specialty pizzas that are available only in Canada.

Pizza in the United States

Pizza first made its appearance in the United States with the arrival of Italian immigrants in the late 19th century.

According to a 2009 response published in a column on Serious Eats, the first printed reference to "pizza" served in the US is a 1904 article in The Boston Journal. Giovanni and Gennaro Bruno came to America from Naples, Italy, in 1903 and introduced the Neapolitan pizza to Boston. Later, Vincent Bruno (Giovanni's son) went on to open the first pizzeria in Chicago.

Conflicting stories have the first pizzeria opening in 1905 when Gennaro Lombardi applied for a license in New York to make and sell pizza.  One of the generally accepted first US businesses to sell pizza, Lombardi's, opened in 1897 as a grocery store at 53½ Spring Street, with tomato pies wrapped in paper and tied with a string sold at lunchtime to workers from the area's factories. In 1905, putative founder Gennaro Lombardi received a business license to operate a pizzeria restaurant and soon had a clientele that included Italian tenor Enrico Caruso. He later passed the business on to his son, George.

Pizza was brought to the Trenton area of New Jersey with Joe's Tomato Pies opening in 1910, followed soon by Papa's Tomato Pies in 1912. In 1936, De Lorenzo's Tomato Pies was opened. While Joe's Tomato Pies has closed, both Papa's and Delorenzo's have been run by the same families since their openings and remain among the most popular pizzas in the area. Frank Pepe Pizzeria Napoletana in New Haven, Connecticut, was another early pizzeria that opened in 1925 (after the owner served pies from local carts and bakeries for 20–25 years) and is famous for its New Haven–style Clam Pie. Frank Pepe's nephew Sal Consiglio opened a competing store, Sally's Apizza, on the other end of the block, in 1938. Both establishments are still run by descendants of the original family. When Sal died, over 2,000 people attended his wake, and The New York Times ran a half-page memoriam. The D'Amore family introduced pizza to Los Angeles in 1939.

Before the 1940s, pizza consumption was limited mostly to Italian immigrants and their descendants. Following World War II, veterans returning from the Italian Campaign, who were introduced to Italy's native cuisine, proved a ready market for pizza in particular, touted by "veterans ranging from the lowliest private to Dwight D. Eisenhower". By the 1960s, it was popular enough to be featured in an episode of Popeye the Sailor. Pizza consumption has exploded in the U.S with the introduction of pizza chains such as Domino's and Pizza Hut.

Two entrepreneurs, Ike Sewell and Ric Riccardo, invented Chicago-style deep-dish pizza, in 1943. They opened their own restaurant on the corner of Wabash and Ohio, Pizzeria Uno.

Pizza chains sprang up with pizza's popularity rising. Leading early pizza chains were Shakey's Pizza, founded in 1954 in Sacramento, California; Pizza Hut, founded in 1958 in Wichita, Kansas; and Little Caesars, founded in 1959 in Garden City, Michigan. Later restaurant chains in the dine-in pizza market were Bertucci's, Happy Joe's, Monical's Pizza, California Pizza Kitchen, Godfather's Pizza, and Round Table Pizza, as well as Domino's, Pizza Hut, Little Caesars and Papa John's. Pizzas from take and bake pizzerias, and chilled or frozen pizzas from supermarkets make pizza readily available nationwide. 13% of the US population consumes pizza on any given day.

See also

 Food history
 Pizza in China
 Pizza effect

References

Bibliography

Further reading
 Barrett, Liz (2014). Pizza: A Slice of American History. Minneapolis: Voyageur Press
 Dickie, John (2010). Delizia: The Epic History of the Italians and Their Food. New York: Free Press.
 Helstosky, Carol (2008). Pizza: A Global History. London: Berg.
 Mattozzi, Antonio (2015). Inventing the Pizzeria: A History of Pizza Making in Naples. London: Bloomsbury Academic

Pizza
Pizza